Bedok MRT station is an above-ground Mass Rapid Transit (MRT) station on the East West Line in Bedok, Singapore. Located at the town centre of Bedok, this station is built on a traffic island in the middle of New Upper Changi Road. It is one of the most crowded MRT stations in eastern Singapore. Despite the close proximity of the 3 MRT stations to one another, Bedok MRT Station (East West MRT Line), Bedok North MRT station (Downtown MRT Line) and Bedok South MRT station (Thomson-East Coast MRT Line) are not connected continuously.

Bedok MRT station is connected to Bedok Bus Interchange. It has many amenities close by such as Bedok Mall, Bedok Point, Djitsun Mall Bedok, Bedok Interchange Hawker Centre, Heartbeat@Bedok and Bedok Town Square.

In between here and Kembangan MRT station, there is a tunnel but no underground stations in between.

History

Bedok MRT station opened on 4 November 1989 along with all other EWL stations from Bugis to Tanah Merah.

Like many above-ground MRT stations, the station was initially built without platform screen doors to prevent passengers from falling off the platform and onto the train tracks. Installation of platform screen doors started on 4 November 2010 and started operations on 11 January 2011 along with Paya Lebar station as a safety precaution, followed by HVLS fans that subsequently began operations on 26 June 2012.

References

External links

 

Railway stations in Singapore opened in 1989
Bedok
Mass Rapid Transit (Singapore) stations